The 1954/1955 News of the World Snooker Tournament was a professional snooker tournament sponsored by the News of the World. The tournament was won by Jackie Rea who won all of his 8 matches. He finished ahead of Joe Davis who won 6 matches. The News of the World Snooker Tournament ran from 1949/50 to 1959 but this was the last to be held at Leicester Square Hall, which closed soon after the end of the tournament.

Format
The 1954/55 event was a round-robin snooker tournament and was played from 6 September 1954 to 15 January 1955. All matches were played at Leicester Square Hall in London. There were 9 competitors and a total of 36 matches. The competitors were Joe Davis, Fred Davis, Walter Donaldson, John Barrie, Albert Brown, Alec Brown, John Pulman, Jackie Rea and qualifier Kingsley Kennerley. Each match lasted three days and was the best of 37 frames.

Each match was separately handicapped. Joe Davis played level with Fred Davis and gave Walter Donaldson and John Pulman 14, Albert Brown 18, Alec Brown 23, John Barrie 24, Jackie Rea and Kingsley Kennerley 25. Fred Davis gave John Pulman 10, Walter Donaldson 12, Albert Brown and John Barrie 14, Alec Brown 16, Jackie Rea 18 and Kingsley Kennerley 21. Walter Donaldson played level with John Pulman and gave Albert Brown and John Barrie 12, Alec Brown 14, Jackie Rea 16 and Kingsley Kennerley 18. John Pulman gave Albert Brown 5, Alec Brown 10, John Barrie 14, Jackie Rea 16 and Kingsley Kennerley 18. Albert Brown played level with Alec Brown and John Barrie and gave Kingsley Kennerley 12 and Jackie Rea 14. John Barrie played level with Alec Brown 0 and Jackie Rea and Kingsley Kennerley 7. Alec Brown gave Jackie Rea 5 and Kingsley Kennerley 12. Jackie Rea gave Kingsley Kennerley 7.

Results
Joe Davis made a break of 146 on 7 December, the second day of his match against Albert Brown. He potted a pink after his fourth red. The break equalled Davis's own record break, set on 1 March 1950.

Jackie Rea won all his 8 matches, clinching victory after his 19–18 win against John Barrie on 15 December.

The match between Joe Davis and his brother, Fred was the last competitive match played at Leicester Square Hall before it closed. Joe won the match 19–18 and made a 137 clearance on the final day. The following Saturday, Joe Davis compiled the first officially recognised maximum break in a match against 68-year-old fellow Englishman Willie Smith. The match between Davis and Smith was played as part of a series of events marking the closure of the hall.

Table

The positions were determined firstly by the number of matches won (MW) and, in the event of a tie, the number of frames won (FW). The result of the match between Albert Brown and Alec Brown is not known. Albert Brown led 15–9 after the second day.

Qualifying
The qualifying tournament was held from 6 to 15 May 1954. These matches were also played at Leicester Square Hall in London. There were 3 competitors: Kingsley Kennerley, Sydney Lee and Harry Stokes. Like the main event, each match lasted three days and was the best of 37 frames. Kennerley won both his matches to qualify. Stokes beat Lee in the other match.

Broadcasting
The BBC showed three short, 30 minute, TV programmes during the matches between Joe Davis and John Pulman on 8 October, between John Pulman and John Barrie on 28 December, and between Walter Donaldson and John Pulman on 12 January. The commentator on each occasion was Sidney Smith.

References

News of the World Snooker Tournament
News of the World Tournament
News of the World Tournament
News of the World Tournament
News of the World Tournament
News of the World Tournament
News of the World Tournament